See:
Central Department Store in Thailand and Indonesia
Central Department Store (Los Angeles)
Central Department Store (Rostov-on-Don)
Central Department Store (Sofia)
TsUM, Tsentralny Universalny Magazin', lit. Central Department Store, Russia